This is the Tamil discography of veteran Indian female playback singer P. Susheela, who sang in over 6000 songs in Tamil. She gave her voice to actress and thespians in the Tamil Film Industry such as Padmini, B. Saroja Devi, Jayalalitha.

Collaboration

Music composers
Major music director work with her G. Ramanathan, S. Rajeswara Rao, T. R. Ramanathan, A. M. Rajah, K. V. Mahadevan, M. S. Viswanathan, T. K. Ramamoorthy, R. Govardhanam, R. Sudarsanam, Vedha, V. Kumar, S. M. Subbaiah Naidu, G. K. Venkatesh, G. Devarajan, P. Srinivasan, R. Parathasarathy, Ilaiyaraaja, Shankar–Ganesh, Kunnakudi Vaidyanathan, A. R. Rahman,

Playback singers
She also sang duets with many male playback singers such as C. S. Jayaraman, T. M. Soundararajan, Sirkazhi Govindarajan, A. M. Rajah, S. C. Krishnan, A. L. Raghavan, S. P. Balasubrahmanyam, K. J. Yesudas, Mano, Malaysia Vasudevan, P. Jayachandran, T. R. Maharajan.

She has sung with other female singers such as Soolamangalam Sisters,  L. R. Eswari, A. P. Komala, S. Janaki, Sarala, L. R. Anjali, B. S. Sasirekha, P. Leela, T. V. Rathnam, Minmini, K. S. Chithra, S. P. Sailaja, K. Jamuna Rani, Bangalore Latha.

She sang duets with actors such as P. S. Veerappa, J. P. Chandrababu and P. Bhanumathi.

Awards

Honours and major awards
 Bharathidasan Award by Government of Tamil Nadu 
 Kalaimamani Award by Government of Tamil Nadu in 1991.

National film awards
The National Film Award for Best Female Playback Singer was introduced in 1968, and Susheela won the award for her rendition of Paal Polave by a film Uyarndha Manithan.

Tamil Nadu State Film Awards
State Film Awards 3 times for the Best Female Playback by the Government of Tamil Nadu.|

List of Tamil film discography

1950s

1960s

1970s

1980s

1990s

2000s

2010s

2020s

Non-film songs

References

External links

Discographies of Indian artists
Lists of songs recorded by Indian singers